Princess Therese of Nassau-Weilburg (Terezya Vasilyevna Nassauskaya; 17 April 1815 in Weilburg, Duchy of Nassau – 8 December 1871 in Prague, Kingdom of Bohemia, Austria-Hungary) was a member of the House of Nassau-Weilburg and a Princess of Nassau-Weilburg by birth. Through her marriage to Duke Peter of Oldenburg, Therese was also a Duchess of Oldenburg.

Family
Therese was the second child and daughter of William, Duke of Nassau and his first wife Princess Louise of Saxe-Hildburghausen.

Marriage and issue
Therese married Duke Peter of Oldenburg, second and younger son of Duke George of Oldenburg and his wife Catherine Pavlovna of Russia, on 23 April 1837 in Biebrich. Therese and Peter had eight children:

Alexandra of Oldenburg (2 June 1838, St. Petersburg – 13 April 1900 Kiev, Ukraine); m. Grand Duke Nicholas Nikolaevich of Russia.
 Nicholas of Oldenburg (9 May 1840, St. Petersburg – 20 January 1886, Geneva, Switzerland); m.  Maria Bulazel created  Countess of Osternburg.
 Cecile of Oldenburg (27 February 1842 St. Petersburg – 11 January 1843, St. Petersburg)
 Alexander of Oldenburg (2 June 1844, St Petersburg, – 6 September 1932, Biarritz, France). Heir of the Russian Oldenburgs. He married Princess Eugenia Maximilianovna of Leuchtenberg. Their only son, Duke Peter Alexandrovich of Oldenburg, married Grand Duchess Olga Alexandrovna of Russia
 Catherine of Oldenburg (21 September 1846, St. Petersburg – 23 June 1866, St. Petersburg)
 George of Oldenburg (17 April 1848, St. Petersburg – 17 March 1871, St. Petersburg)
 Konstantin of Oldenburg (27 April 1850, St. Petersburg – 18 March 1906 in Nice, France); m. Princess Agrippina Japaridze, divorced Princess Dadiani and later created Countess of Zarnekau.
 Therese of Oldenburg (30 March 1852, St. Petersburg – 18 April 1883 St. Petersburg); m. George Maximilianovich, 6th Duke of Leuchtenberg (1852–1912)

Ancestry

References

1815 births
1871 deaths
People from Weilburg
People from the Duchy of Nassau
House of Nassau-Weilburg
Duchesses of Oldenburg
Princesses of Nassau-Weilburg
Daughters of monarchs